A cumulonimbus incus (Latin incus, "anvil"), also known as an anvil cloud, is a cumulonimbus cloud which has reached the level of stratospheric stability and has formed the characteristic flat, anvil-top shape. It signifies a thunderstorm in its mature stage, succeeding the cumulonimbus calvus stage. Cumulonimbus incus is a sub-form of Cumulonimbus capillatus.

Hazards 
A cumulonimbus incus is a mature thunderstorm cloud generating many dangerous elements.

 Lightning: this storm cloud is capable of producing bursts of cloud-to-ground lightning.
 Hail: hailstones may fall from this cloud if it's a highly unstable environment (which favours a more vigorous storm updraft).
 Heavy rain: this cloud may drop several inches (millimetres) of rain in a short amount of time. This can cause flash flooding.
 Strong wind: gale-force winds from a downburst may occur under this cloud.
 Tornadoes: in severe cases (most commonly with supercells), it can produce tornadoes.

Classification 

Cumulonimbus clouds can be powerful. If the correct atmospheric conditions are met, they can grow into a supercell storm. This cloud may be a single-cell thunderstorm or one cell in a multicellular thunderstorm. They are capable of producing severe storm conditions for a short amount of time.

In popular culture 
 It is a key plot point in the anime Tenki no Ko (Weathering With You).

References

External links

Cumulus
Cirrus

fr:Cumulonimbus#Cumulonimbus capillatus et incus